11th parallel may refer to:

11th parallel north, a circle of latitude in the Northern Hemisphere
11th parallel south, a circle of latitude in the Southern Hemisphere